Dominica was set to compete at the 2019 World Athletics Championships in Doha, Qatar, from 27 September to 6 October 2019.

Results

Women 
Field events

References

Nations at the 2019 World Athletics Championships
World Championships in Athletics
Dominica at the World Championships in Athletics